HMS Hotham may refer to more than one ship of the British Royal Navy:

 , a frigate in commission from 1943 to 1946 briefly named Hotham while under construction in 1943
 , a frigate which served in the Royal Navy from 1944 to 1956

Royal Navy ship names